Sinus of Morgagni may refer to:
 Aortic sinus
 Sinus of Morgagni (pharynx)